The "Old Southwest" is an informal name for the southwestern frontier territories of the United States from the American Revolutionary War (1775–1783) through the early 19th century, at the point when the territorial lands were organized into states.

The territory of the Old Southwest eventually formed the states of Missouri, Mississippi, Arkansas, Alabama, Louisiana, Texas, and parts of Tennessee, Kentucky, and Florida (panhandle).

Geography

Historians usually describe the Old Southwest as bounded by the Ohio River to the north, the Gulf of Mexico to the south, the Red River of the South to the west, and to the east, the western boundaries of Virginia, North Carolina, and Georgia. Much of northern, western, and southern Georgia is part of the Old Southwest, as the state did not grow into its modern boundaries until 1827. Some authors set the northern boundary of the Old Southwest at the Tennessee River rather than the Ohio. In the field of literature, the term is used to reference the Appalachian regions of the Southeastern states as well.

Historians usually include West Florida in the Old Southwest, but the peninsula of Florida, or "East Florida," is often excluded. The Appalachicola River was the boundary between the Spanish provinces of West Florida and East Florida until 1820.

The Florida Parishes of Louisiana, lying east of the Mississippi, were originally part of the Old Southwest. The Louisiana Purchase in 1803 added the city of New Orleans to the region.

History

The Old Southwest includes the homelands of numerous American Indian nations, including the Cherokees, Choctaws, Creek Nation, and Shawnee Nation. The European monarchies of Spain, Kingdom of France, and Kingdom of Great Britain competed with one another for territory and the allegiance of Indian leaders. In 1763 France made peace with Great Britain, following the French and Indian War, by surrendering all its territorial claims east of the Mississippi River. The British government soon reserved all the land west of the Appalachians for Indians, but many colonists defied the order and occupied parts of the territory.

After the American Revolutionary War, in the Treaty of Paris of 1783, Britain ceded most of its North American territory to the United States, while Spain, a U.S. ally, took over in West and East Florida. In 1787 the United States Congress organized the Northwest Territory and established rules for founding new states, but the Old Southwest proved more difficult to manage. The southern states of Virginia, North Carolina, and Georgia each claimed that their western boundary extended to the Mississippi River.

White residents of Virginia's western territory separated in 1790 and entered the union as the Commonwealth of Kentucky in 1792. North Carolina's western claim briefly became the illegal State of Franklin in the 1780s. In 1790 it was organized as the Southwest Territory, and in 1796 it became the State of Tennessee. In the 1790s, Georgia politicians conspired to sell off western land in the Yazoo land scandal. The state finally gave up all its western claims to the federal government in 1802, in exchange for a promise to acquire all property belonging to Indians in Georgia. The western land was organized as the Mississippi Territory, which eventually became the states of Mississippi (1817) and Alabama (1819).

The Spanish province of West Florida extended along the Gulf Coast from the Mississippi River to the Apalachicola River. American incursions between 1811 and 1818 gradually absorbed most of West Florida, and in 1819 Spain ceded all its Florida land to the United States.

Economy
The region's climate and soils favored commodity agriculture over industrial development. The U.S. purchase of New Orleans from France in 1803 gave the region a large seaport to facilitate global trade. American troops annexed the Spanish port of Mobile in 1813, then occupied Pensacola. By the 1840s, the Old Southwest states of Alabama and Mississippi had become wealthy by using slave labor to produce cotton for economic use.

See also 
 Royal Proclamation of 1763
 Indian removal
 Indian barrier state
 Southwest Territory
 Indian Reserve (1763)
 Overmountain Men

Notes

References
 Bateman, Fred, and Thomas Weiss. A deplorable scarcity: the failure of industrialization in the slave economy. (Chapel Hill: University of North Carolina Press, 1981).
 Clark, Thomas Dionysius.  The Old Southwest, 1795-1830: Frontiers in Conflict.  (Norman: University of Oklahoma Press, 1996)
 Flora, Joseph, Lucinda Hardwick MacKethan, and Todd Taylor.  "Old Southwest".  The Companion to Southern Literature: Themes, Genres, Places, People, Movements, and Motifs.  (Baton Rouge: Louisiana State University Press, 2001).

1775 establishments in the Thirteen Colonies
1819 disestablishments in the United States
Geography of the United States
Regions of the United States